Papilio demoleus is a common and widespread swallowtail butterfly. The butterfly is also known as the lime butterfly, lemon butterfly, lime swallowtail, and chequered swallowtail. These common names refer to their host plants, which are usually citrus species such as the cultivated lime. Unlike most swallowtail butterflies, it does not have a prominent tail. When the adult stage is taken into consideration, the lime swallowtail is the shortest-lived butterfly, with male adults dying after four days and females after a week. The butterfly is native to Asia and Australia, and can be considered an invasive pest in other parts of the world. The butterfly has spread to Hispaniola island (Dominican Republic) in the Western Hemisphere, and to Mahé, Seychelles.

Description

The butterfly is tailless and has a wingspan 80–100 mm. Above, the background colour is black. A broad, irregular yellow band is found on the wings above, which is broken in the case of the forewing. Besides this, the butterfly has a large number of irregular spots on the wing. The upper hindwing has a red tornal spot with blue edging around it.

As the caterpillar ages, its hunger for leaf tissue continues to grow.

Detailed description as given by Charles Thomas Bingham in 1905:

Status, range, and habitat
P. demoleus is perhaps the most widely distributed swallowtail in the world. The butterfly can be found in:

The Southeast Asian subspecies Papilio demoleus malayanus recently established an abundant non-native population on Mahé in Seychelles This species was probably accidentally introduced to Mahé a few years ago (first records in November 2016). Further dispersal events of Papilio demoleus within Seychelles to other granitic islands of the archipelago, e.g. Praslin and La Digue, are expected.

Formerly absent from Borneo, it is now one of the commonest papilionids in Sabah and Sarawak in Malaysian Borneo, Kalimantan (Indonesian Borneo), and Brunei.

In recent years, the butterfly has spread to Hispaniola island (Dominican Republic) in the Western Hemisphere, and subsequently to Jamaica, and Puerto Rico. The Dominican population originated from Southeast Asia but how the butterfly reached there is not known.

The widespread range of P. demoleus indicates the butterfly's tolerance and adaptation to diverse habitats. It is found in savannahs, fallow lands, gardens, evergreen and semi-evergreen forests, and shows a preference for streams and riverbeds. It is common in urban gardens and may also be encountered in wooded country. The butterfly is also a very successful invader, its spread appearing to be due to its strong flight, increase in urbanisation and agricultural land use that opens up new areas for dispersal, and greater availability of food plants.

Taxonomy
Five related butterflies form the group of lime butterflies in the genus Papilio of which P. demoleus Linnaeus, 1758 is the flagship species, which gives the name to the group. The other morphologically related butterflies are:
 Papilio demodocus (Esper, 1798)
 Papilio erithonioides Grose-Smith, 1891
 Papilio grosesmithi Rothschild, 1926
 Papilio morondavana Grose-Smith, 1891

The citrus swallowtail (P. demodocus Esper) is found in sub-Saharan Africa, while the other three species are endemic to Madagascar.

Research into the biogeography, phylogeny, and analysis of vicariance relationships dating back to the Cretaceous, of the "lime butterfly" or "demoleus" group, suggest that the group of lime swallowtails diversified in Madagascar in the middle Miocene.

Six subspecies are recognised in P. demoleus:
 P. d. demoleus Linnaeus, 1758 — Across Asia from China to the Arabian peninsula, and now colonized Turkey, Iraq, Syria, the Philippines, the Talaud and Sula islands, and the Moluccas (Ambon and Ceram)
 P. d. libanius Fruhstorfer, 1908 — Taiwan, Philippines, Sula, Talaud
 P. d. malayanus Wallace, 1865 — Sumatra and the Malaysian peninsula, and now expanded its range to Southern Europe (one record in Portugal), Greater Sunda Islands (Sumatra, Java, Borneo, and Bali), Wallacea (Sulawesi, Sumbawa, Lombok, Timor, Leti, Flores, Wetar, and Alor), New Guinea, Bismarck Archipelago, Christmas Island, Torres Strait Islands (Dauan Island), Greater Antilles Islands (Hispaniola, Jamaica, Puerto Rico, Cuba, and Nueva Gerona), and Seychelles (Mahé)
 P. d. novoguineensis Rothschild, 1908 — the southeastern edge of Papua New Guinea around Port Moresby
 P. d. sthenelus Macleay, 1826 — Australia
 P. d. stenelinus Rothschild, 1895 — Sumba, Flores, and Alor

Behavior

This butterfly is an avid mud-puddler and visitor of flowers. It basks with its wings held wide open on tufts of grass and herbs, and generally keeps within a metre of the ground, even on cloudy days. It relies on its quick flight for escape.
It has a number of modes of flight. In the cool of the morning, the flight is slow considering that it is an edible and unprotected swallowtail. As the day progresses, it flies fast, straight, and low. In the hotter part of the day, it may be found settling on damp patches, where it will remain motionless, except for an occasional flutter of wings, if not disturbed. It is also a frequent visitor of flowers in gardens, where it shows a preference for flowers of smaller herbs rather than larger plants such as the ubiquitous Lantana with its plentiful blooms. It can be found swarming in the groves of its food plants.

Research on freshly emerged imagines of P. demoleus showed that they have an inborn or spontaneous preference while feeding for blue and purple colours, while the yellow, yellowish-green, green, and blue-green colours are completely neglected.

Lifecycle

The number of generations of P. demoleus is dependent upon temperature – near the equator, nine generations have been recorded, while in warm temperate China, five generations have been recorded. In the ideal conditions of a laboratory, a generation has been recorded to take place in just over 30 days. The typical time for one generation of P. demoleus to mature in the field ranges from 26 to 59 days. In cold climates, the lime butterfly is known to pass the winter as pupae. Typically, the butterfly undergoes five instars as a caterpillar.

The female butterfly goes from plant to plant, laying a single egg at a time on top of a leaf, which it holds onto with its legs, and flies off as soon as the egg is laid. The egg is round, light yellowish in colour, flattened at the base, smooth-surfaced, and about 1.5 mm in height. Fertile eggs develop a small red mark at the apex.

The newly hatched caterpillar stays in the middle of the upperside of the leaf. The first instar of the caterpillar is black, with a black head and two rows of subdorsal fleshy spines. The second, third, and fourth instars are dark, with a glossy, dark-brown head, and white markings on the eighth and ninth segments of the caterpillar, which resemble a white patch of uric acid deposited in a bird's droppings, helping them escape predation while remaining in moderately open places.

As the instars progress, this resemblance is lost. From the fifth instar onwards, the caterpillars now turn cylindrical in shape, tapered towards the rear, and uniformly pale green in colour with a white subspiracular band. An additional black band is developed on the fourth and fifth segments with two black and two bluish spots on them. The eighth and ninth segments, which earlier provided the camouflage markings now develop a brown and white band. At this stage, the caterpillars are forced to inhabit secluded places.

The pupa, which is rugose (wrinkled), stout, and 30 mm in length, has two projections to the front on its head and also one on its thorax, and resembles that of the common Mormon (Papilio polytes), the difference being that the common Mormon pupa has a deeper cut between the projections and its abdomen is more protruded on the sides, having a small point.

The pupa is dimorphic with regards to colour, with the colour developing according to the prevalent colour and texture in the background. The green morph, which is found amongst green vegetation and smoother textures, is light green and unmarked or with yellow dorsal markings. When situated among brown or dry objects, the pupa tend to turn light grey brown to pink brown and develop cryptic dark brown and black striation.

The adults fly in every month, but are particularly abundant during and after the monsoons.

Captive breeding of P. demoleus in Riyadh has revealed these data about the lifespan of various stages at that locality:
 Number of generations per year: 8
 Duration of egg stage: 3.1 to 6.1 days
 Duration of larva stage: 12.9 and 22.7 days
 Duration of pupa stage: 8.0 to 22.4 days
 Duration of adult stage: 4 to 6 days with average of 5.1 days

Parasitism and predation
 
Despite their two-stage camouflage scheme, some caterpillars of P. demoleus are found by parasitic wasps, which lay dozens of eggs in them. The parasitic wasp larvae eat the caterpillar from the inside. Initially, the vital organs are avoided, but by the time the caterpillar is ready to pupate, even the vital organs are consumed. Shortly before, or soon after the caterpillar pupates, the parasitoids emerge from their host, thus killing it.

In Saudi Arabia, the highest mortality rate was found to be in larvae and pupae in cultivated populations due to a bacterium of the genus Bacillus. In addition, eggs and larvae were heavily preyed upon by two unidentified species of spiders which were abundant on citrus trees.

In China, species of fungi in the genus Ophiocordyceps are known to parasitize many kinds of caterpillars, including P. demoleus. The spores were spread out on the parents, and infect the young caterpillar, then when the caterpillars become pupae, they will fail to develop into adults; instead, the fungi kill and eat the caterpillar flesh from within, and grow a spore bud out of the dead caterpillar corpse. The fungi known as dōng chóng xià cǎo are thought to have medicinal properties in China, and are known in English as caterpillar fungus.

In India, these braconid wasp parasitoids are known to parasitize P. demoleus larvae:
 Apanteles species including Apanteles papilionis
 Habrobracon hebetor

In Thailand, a number of organisms have been recorded attacking immature stages of P. demoleus:
 Egg parasites –
Ooencyrtus malayensis Ferriere (Hymenoptera: Encyrtidae)
Tetrastichus sp. (Hymenoptera: Eulophidae)
 Larval stage –
 Erycia nymphalidophaga Baronoff (Diptera: Tachinidae) (parasite)
 Cantheconidea furcellata (Wolff) (Pentatomidae predator
 Other natural enemies of larvae included reduviid bugs; birds; spiders; sphecid wasps; and chameleons.
 Pupal parasites –
 Brachymeria sp. (Hymenoptera: Chalcididae)
 Pteromalus puparum Linnaeus (Hymenoptera: Pteromalidae)
 Ophiocordyceps

In Jamaica, an encyrtid egg parasitoid and a chalcidoid parasitoid have been reported.

Food plants

The larval food plants of P. demoleus in Asia are from the family Rutaceae, while in Australia and Papua New Guinea, the butterfly also feeds on host plants of family Fabaceae.

Family Rutaceae

 Cultivated lime, orange and lemon.
C. aurantifolia, C. grandis, C. limon, C. sinensis,
 Atalanta racemosa
 Glycosmis pentaphylla
 Ruta graveolens
 Bael (Aegle marmelos)
 Murraya koenigii (curry tree)
 Chloroxylon swietenia
 Acronychia pedunculata
 Microcitrus australis (Australian round-lime, Australian lime)

Family Rhamnaceae
 Ber (Ziziphus mauritiana)

Family Fabaceae
They have been observed on:
 Many species of Cullen: Cullen australasicum, C. badocanum, C. balsamicum, C. cinereum, C. patens (spreading scurf-pea, native verbine), C. pustulatum, and C. tenax (tough scurf-pea, emu-foot, emu grass), and C. leucanthum.
 Psoralea pinnata (fountain bush)

Economic significance

The lime butterfly is an economic pest on many cultivated citrus species in India, Pakistan, Iraq, and the Middle East. Due to its history of successful dispersal and range extension, the lime butterfly is likely to spread from its original point of introduction in Hispaniola in the Caribbean to neighbouring Florida, Central America, and South America. Due to its capability for rapid population growth under favourable circumstances and its having been recorded to have five generations in a year in temperate regions of China, it is considered a serious potential threat. The caterpillars can completely defoliate young citrus trees (below 2 feet) and devastate citrus nurseries. In mature trees, caterpillars may prefer young leaves and leaf flush.

Hand-picking of caterpillars and spraying with endosulfan 35 EC (2 ml/10 litres of water) were the recommended means of pest control by Indian government agencies and agricultural colleges, however, endosulfan has since been banned by the Supreme Court of India.

See also
List of butterflies of India (Papilionidae)
List of butterflies of Jamaica

References

Further reading
Chattopadhyay, Jagannath. (2007), "Swallowtail Butterflies, Biology and Ecology of a Few Indian Species". Desh Prakashan, Kolkata, West Bengal, India. .
F. Martin Brown and Bernard Heineman, Jamaica and its Butterflies (E. W. Classey, London 1972), plate VIII

External links

 Host plant database, NHM UK
line swallowtail on the UF / IFAS Featured Creatures Web site
 

demoleus
Butterflies of Asia
Butterflies of Europe
Butterflies of Indochina
Butterflies of Borneo
Butterflies of Singapore
Butterflies described in 1758
Taxa named by Carl Linnaeus